Günther Jakobs (n. Mönchengladbach, July 26, 1937), is a German jurist, specializing in criminal law, criminal procedural law and philosophy of law.

Jakobs studied legal sciences in Cologne, Kiel and Bonn, and in 1967 he graduated from the University of Bonn with a thesis on criminal law and competition doctrine.

In 1971 he obtained his law degree, also in Bonn, through a work on negligence in the crime of result and the following year he held his first chair at the University of Kiel.

Jakobs enjoys prestige in Latin America and Spain, as his conception of Criminal Law, building a system of Functional Criminal Law, has been echoed in doctrine and jurisprudence. In this last area, the Jakobsian concept of the "Role" has served to limit the liability of those who only intervene with neutral behavior. By his position, he has also echoed his conception of authorship and participation in special crimes, with his theory of crimes of breach of duty, and his doctrine of the "criminal law of the enemy."

Books 
In German
 Die Konkurrenz von Tötungsdelikten mit Körperverletzungsdelikten (Dissertation), Bonn 1967
 Studien zum fahrlässigen Erfolgsdelikt (Habilitationsschrift), Bonn 1971, Buchausgabe Berlin/New York 1972 
 Schuld und Prävention, Tübingen 1976 
 (als Herausgeber:) Rechtsgeltung und Konsens, Berlin 1976 
 Strafrecht, Allgemeiner Teil – Die Grundlagen und die Zurechnungslehre (Lehrbuch), Berlin/New York 1983, 2. Aufl. 1991 , Studienausgabe 1993 
 Der strafrechtliche Handlungsbegriff, München 1992 
 Das Schuldprinzip, Opladen 1993 
 Geschriebenes Recht und wirkliches Recht beim Schwangerschaftsabbruch, Bochum 1994 
 Die strafrechtliche Zurechnung von Tun und Unterlassen, Paderborn 1996 ; dass., Opladen 1996 
 Norm, Person, Gesellschaft – Vorüberlegungen zu einer Rechtsphilosophie, Berlin 1997, 2. Aufl. 1999 
 Tötung auf Verlangen, Euthanasie und Strafrechtssystem, München 1998 
 Urkundenfälschung – Revision eines Täuschungsdelikts, Köln/Berlin/Bonn/München 2000 
 Staatliche Strafe – Bedeutung und Zweck, Paderborn/München/Wien/Zürich 2004 
 Kritik des Vorsatzbegriffs, Mohr Siebeck (Verlag) 2020 

1937 births
Living people
German legal scholars
Scholars of criminal law
Jurists from North Rhine-Westphalia